Maho Beach is a beach on the Dutch side of the Caribbean island of Saint Martin, in the territory of Sint Maarten. It is famous for being adjacent to the Princess Juliana International Airport and is a popular site for tourists and plane watchers, who visit the beach to watch aircraft on final approach land at the airport.

Location

Due to the unique proximity of low-flying airliners arriving and departing from Princess Juliana International Airport, the location is popular with plane spotters. This is one of the few places in the world where aircraft can be viewed in their flight path just outside the end of the runway. Watching airliners pass over the beach is such a popular activity that daily arrivals and departures airline timetables are displayed on a board in most bars and restaurants on the beach.

This makes the beach a popular location for photographers and video makers who intend to capture the aircraft approaching the airport.

There is a danger of people standing on the beach being blown into solid objects or the water because of the jet blast from aircraft taking off from runway 10. The local government warns that closely approaching and departing aircraft can "result in serious injury and/or death". An additional fence has been added recently behind runway 10, in order to prevent people from hanging onto the main fence surrounding the runway to experience being blasted by the jet flow.

The beach itself is white sand and has little to no vegetation because of jet blast erosion. The Caravanserai Resort, the Sunset Bar and other restaurants/night clubs such as Bamboo Bernies and Bliss are located nearby. The beach is popular with windsurfers and skimboarders because of occasional large waves.

History
On October 16, 2008, the Maho area of St. Maarten was badly damaged by Hurricane Omar, which destroyed the Sunset Bar and Grill as well as Bamboo Bernies and Bliss.  In November 2009, the Sunset Bar and Grill and Bliss were both re-opened. Hurricane Omar reduced the beach to boulders, and damaged the nearby Royal Islander Club La Plage which re-opened February 14, 2009. The same occurred with Hurricane Irma in 2017.

On 12 July 2017, as Caribbean Airlines Flight 457 was taking off from the airport, a 57-year-old woman from New Zealand was killed by jet blast. The woman was holding on to a fence at the end of the runway when the wind blew her away, causing her head to smash into concrete.

References

External links

 Maho Beach Photo Gallery

Landforms of Sint Maarten
Beaches of the Netherlands